Morden i Sandhamn (English: Sandhamn Murders) is a Swedish television crime drama series. It is based on the books of the same name by writer, Viveca Sten. The series is broadcast on TV4, which has presented eight seasons from 20 December 2010. The series follows Nora Linde (Alexandra Rapaport), a lawyer who owns a summer house on Sandhamn, and her assistance in solving various murders on or near that island. Portraying Nora's children, Simon and Anna, are real-life siblings, Lion Monn and Ping Monn, respectively. The first six seasons had Thomas Andreasson (Jakob Cedergren) of the Nacka police as the lead detective. From season seven, Alexander Forsman (Nicolai Cleve Broch) is the new lead detective.

Seasons one to five comprise three episodes per season, each covering one investigation arc. For seasons six and seven there were eight episodes each, with two parts per investigation. Seasons six and seven were broadcast as four double-episodes on C More Film and eight single episodes on TV4. In August 2020 TV4 announced that an eighth season was in production. It was broadcast from 8 August 2022 on C More as three double episodes each covering a story arcs and as six single episodes.

Seasons one to five (as Sandhamn Murders) were broadcast from May 2021 on Australian network, SBS-TV's streaming service, On Demand. Seasons six and seven followed in July 2021 on the same network. Morden i Sandhamn seasons one to three were released as The Sandhamn Murders, Vol. 1, a box set of 3× DVD, in March 2019. It was issued at the same time as The Sandhamn Murders, Vol. 2, also a box set of 3× DVD, which covers seasons four and six. Both box sets were issued in Swedish with English subtitles. The Swedish television series was remade as a Polish series, Zbrodnia (English: The Crime), which premiered on October 16, 2014.

Seasons

 Season 1: Morden i Sandhamn – I de lugnaste vatten ('In the calmest waters') (3 episodes) – 2010
 Season 2: Morden i Sandhamn – I den innersta kretsen ('In the inner circle') (3 episodes) – 2012
 Season 3: Morden i Sandhamn – I grunden utan skuld ('Basically without guilt') (3 episodes) – 2013
 Season 4: Morden i Sandhamn – I natt är du död ('Tonight you're dead') (3 episodes) – 2014
 Season 5: Morden i Sandhamn – I stundens hetta ('In the heat of the moment') (3 episodes) – 2015
 Season 6: Morden i Sandhamn – I maktens skugga part 1 and 2 ('In the shadow of power'), I sanningens namn part 1 and 2 ('In the name of truth'), I fel sällskap part 1 and 2 ('In the wrong company'), I nöd och lust part 1 and 2 ('For better or worse') (8 episodes) – 2018
 Season 7: Morden i Sandhamn – Blå lögner part 1 and 2 ('Blue lies'), Tvillingarna part 1 and 2 ('Gemini'), Löftet part 1 and 2 ('Promise'), Vicky part 1 and 2 (8 episodes) – 2020
 Season 8  – Morden i Sandhamn – Angelica part 1 and 2, Lili part 1 and 2, Olivia part 1 and 2 (6 episodes) – 2022

Cast

 Alexandra Rapaport as Nora Linde, financial lawyer, works at Nacka bank, owns a Sandhamn summer house, inherits Brandska, Henrik's former wife, Jonas' partner (separated), becomes a prosecutor at Financial Crimes Unit and then at Serious Crimes Unit (Seasons 1–8)
 Jakob Cedergren as Thomas Andreasson, Nacka police lead detective, owns a summer house on Harö (north of Sandhamn), gets back with ex-wife Pernilla, they have a daughter, Elin, separates from Pernilla again, relocates to Copenhagen, when Pernilla and Elin move there (Seasons 1–6)
  as Mia Holmgren, Nacka police detective, replaces Carina, owns pet dog Bertil, leaves police force (Seasons 2–6)
 Jonas Malmsjö as Henrik Linde, Nora's ex-husband, yachtsman, medical doctor, Marie's partner, later separated from Marie (Seasons 1-2, 4, 6–8)
 Anki Lidén as Margit Grankvist, Nacka police chief (Seasons 1–6)
 Ping Mon H. Wallén/Ping Monn as Anna Linde, Nora and Henrik's daughter, later has summer jobs as cafe waitress, assistant caterer. Later she moves in with her boyfriend in Marstrand. (Seasons 1–4, 6–7) 
 Lotta Tejle as Claire, Thomas' neighbour on Harö, long-term borrower (Seasons 2–6)
 Louise Edlind as Monica Linde, Henrik's mother (Seasons 1–4, 6)
 Lion Monn/Lion Mon H. Wallén as Simon, Nora and Henrik's son, exchange student to United States (Seasons 1–4, 6) 
 Lars Amble as Harald, Henrik's father, KSSS board member (Seasons 1–3)
 Nicolai Cleve Broch as Alexander Forsman, Swedish-Norwegian, Nacka police lead detective, replaces Thomas, Tor's father, separated from Vicky, reconciled for two years (Seasons 7–8)
 Shirin Golchin as Miriam Biano, Nacka uniform police becomes detective, Alexander's partner, leaves Nacka (Seasons 7–8)
 Gustaf Hammarsten as Bengt-Olof Stenmark, Nacka police chief, replaces Margit, married to Kerstin (Seasons 7–8)
  as Carina Persson, Nacka police detective, goes on maternity leave (Seasons 1–2)
 Ane Dahl Torp as Pernilla Andreasson, Thomas' ex-wife, returns to Nacka, rejoins Thomas on Harö, they have a daughter Elin, she returns to Nacka, later separates from Thomas (Seasons 3–6)
 Stefan Gödicke as Jonas Sköld, pilot, Vera's father, rents Brandska, divorces Malin, becomes Nora's partner (Seasons 4–6, 8)
 Saga Samuelsson as Vera Sköld, Jonas' daughter, initially resents Nora's romance with Jonas (Seasons 4–6)
 Johan Hallström as Lennart, Nacka uniform police (Seasons 2–3)
 Johan Hedenberg as Olle Granlund, Sandhamn fisherman, former Coastal Ranger, Anton's father, home handyman (Seasons 4, 6, 8)
 Malin Crépin as Victoria "Vicky", Alexander's estranged wife, abandoned Tor three years earlier, Carl-Johan's daughter with his second wife, reconciled with Alexander and Tor for two years (Seasons 7–8)
 Leona Axelsen as Julia Södergren/Clarissa, catering assistant, bar waitress, becomes a prostitute (Seasons 6–7)
 Kassel Ulving as Tor Forsman, Alexander and Vicky's son, lives on Berit's boat (Seasons 7–8)
 Anton Lundqvist as Pär, Nora's assistant prosecutor at Financial Crimes Unit, Serious Crimes Unit (Seasons 7–8)
 Ing-Marie Carlsson as Berit, Alexander's mother, owns boat (Seasons 7–8)
 Viveca Sten as "waitress" (Season 3, Episode 2), "party attendee" (Season 7, Episode 7).

Season 1 additional cast 

 Harriet Andersson as Signe Brand, Nora's neighbour, long-term permanent Sandhamn resident, owns a dog Kajsa, Nora inherits her house: Brandska 
 Andreas Kundler as Jonny Almhult, Sandhamn fisherman, some-time sketch artist, drinks too much
 Lena Nilsson as Kristina "Kicki" Berggren, sister of Krister
 Eva Stellby as Ellen Almhult, Sandhamn resident, widow of Gustav, Jonny's mother
 Lasse Pettersson as Erik Berggren, widower of Cecilia, father of Krister and Kristina

Season 2 additional cast 

 Mats Rudal as Oscar Juliander, bankruptcy lawyer, KSSS board member, sometime yachtsman, corrupt and ruthless
 Gustav Levin as Hans Rosenjöö, retiring KSSS chairman, accepts profits generated by Oscar despite methodology
 Thomas Hanzon as Ingmar van Hahne, prospective KSSS chairman, runs an art gallery
 Catherine Hansson as Sylvia Juliander, mother of Tom, puts up with Oscar's infidelities
 Anne-Li Norberg as Eva, Oscar's secretary
 Malena Engström as Ingrid Dieter, KSSS lawyer, disagrees with Oscar's methodology
  as Diana Söder, works for Ingmar, mother of Filip, Oscar's mistress
 Anu Sinisalo as Isabelle van Hahne, Ingmar's wife, has influential connections
 Ylva Lööf as Britta Rosenjöö, Hans' wife, photographed guests at Linde's place

Season 3 additional cast 

  as Bengt Österman, Sebbe's father, has intergenerational feud with Rosén family, owns a dog, Wille. Sebbe died in a boating accident almost a year earlier
  as Ingrid Österman, Bengt's wife, Sebbe's mother
 Alba August as Lina Rosén, 18-year old, Marianne's daughter, Jakob's girl-friend, Sara's best friend, Sebbe's friend, died a month later, body parts found eight months later
  as Marianne Rosén, Lina's mother, has intergenerational feud with Österman family
  as Jakob Sandgren, Sebbe's best friend, on boat when Sebbe died, Lina's and then Sara's boyfriend
  as Sara Hammarsten, Lina's best friend, on boat when Sebbe died, becomes Jakob's girlfriend
 Tomas Norström as Göran Nilsson, Marianne's second ex-husband, Lina's stepdad, boat owner
 Angela Kovács as Hanna Hammarsten, Sara’s mother, dislikes Jakob
 Martin Wallström as Magnus, sailing school instructor
 Elisabet Carlsson as Ulrika Sandgren, Jakob's mother
  as Måns Andersson, gym staff, personal trainer
 Moa Zerpe as Sussi, gym staff, Måns' colleague

Season 4 additional cast 

  as Robert Cronwall, retired Coastal Ranger commander
  as Annika Melin (née Andersson), Storken pharmacy manager, Pär's sister
  as Sven Ernskog, Sandhamn delivery man, handyman, former Coastal Ranger (No. 106)
  as Bo Kaufman, recluse, has memory loss, former Coastal Ranger (No. 108)
  as Maria Nielsen, Marcus and David's mother
 Martin Aliaga as Martin Allbäck, Susanna's husband, Jenny's lover
 Katarina Bothéen as Lena Fredell, Jan-Erik's wife
 Sussie Eriksson as Birgitta Cronwall, Robert's wife
 Thomas Hedengran as Anders Martinger, pilot, former Coastal Ranger
  as David Nielsen, 21 year-old, Marcus' younger brother
  as Leif Kihlbery, former Coastal Ranger
 Tanja Lorentzon as Susanna Allbäck, University Support Adviser, Martin's wife, Marcus' lover
  as Elsa Harning, Coastal Rangers training administrator
  as Marie, Henrik's new partner

Season 5 additional cast 

 Kajsa Sandberg as Felicia Grimstad, Victor's girlfriend, Ebba's best friend
 Liv Lemoyne as Ebba Halvorsen, Tobbe's ex-girlfriend, Felicia's best friend
 Eliot Waldfogel as Tobias "Tobbe" Högström, Christoffer's younger brother, Arthur's son, Victor's best friend, Ebba's ex-boyfriend
  as Victor Ekengreen, 16 year-old, Johan and Madeleine's son, Felicia's boyfriend, Tobbe's best friend
  as Christoffer Högström, 21 year-old business college student, Tobbe's older brother, Arthur's son
  as Harry, uniform police
 Bisse Unger as Mattias Carlén, Malena's older brother, Ann-Sofie's nephew
  as Johan Ekengreen, Victor's father
 Filip Berg as Patrik Wennergren, convicted drug dealer
  as Jeanette Grimstad, Felicia's mother
 Marie Robertson as Anna Miller, uniform police
  as Madeleine Ekengreen, Johan's wife, Victor's mother
 Clara Christiansson Drake as Malena Carlén, Vera's friend, Mattias' younger sister
 Molly Sehlin as Theresa "Tessan" Almblad, 15 year-old, flirts with Tobbe
 Agnes Lindström Bolmgren as Ellinor Ekengreen, Victor's older sister
 Peter Schildt as Arthur Högström, Christoffer and Tobbe's father
 Gunilla Backman as Ann-Sofie Carlén, Mattias and Malena's aunt, owns a summer house on Sandhamn
 Cedomir Djordjevic as Goran Minosevitch, Balkan drug-dealer, Patrik's competitor, previous assault convictions

Season 6 additional cast 

 Alexander Karim as Carsten Johnson/Lasse Jonsson, owns newly-built mansion, Celia's husband, property investment manager
 Cecilia Häll as Linda Öberg ( Kronberg), caterer, Gustav's sister
 Kaisa Hammarlund as Celia Johnson, Carsten's wife, London-resident, funds Carsten's investments
 Marvin Dackén as Oliver, Carsten's son
 Alba Karim as Sarah, Carsten's daughter
 Douglas Johansson as Pär-Anders Andersson, Anna's husband, Carsten's neighbour, disgrantled by encroachment and disruption by mansion builders
 Happy Jankell as Maria, Johnsons' au pair 
 Erik Madsen as Dimitri, Russian property investor
 Erik Lönngren as Anton Granlund, Olle's son, pyromaniac
  as Anna Andersson, Pär-Anders' wife
 Niclas Gustafsson as Mats, foreman, building Johnsons' mansion
 Robert Stanczak as Marek, Mats' worker
 Grim Lohman as Benjamin Wallin, Christian and Åsa's son, dislikes camp, gets bullied
  as Maja, camp leader
  as Isak, camp leader
  as Pontus Lindqvist, convicted paedophile, police notified of his release
 Romeo Altera as Samuel, camper, Sebbe's friend, bullies Ben
  as Sebbe, camper, Sammuel's fried, bullies Ben
 Felice Jankell as Ulrika, 25 year-old, wannabe writer, rents Brandska from Nora 
  as Lova, camper, Simon's friend, befriends Ben
 Sara Vilén as Tindra, camper, Lova's and Simon's friend
  as Christian Wallin, Ben's father
  as Åsa Wallin, Ben's mother
 Ulf Stenberg as Niklas Grönros, Christian's business partner
 Hanna Alström as Minna Björkholm, André's wife
 Tobias Aspelin as Dino Hovart, 40 year-old, works at André's car dealership
 Linus Wahlgren as André Björkholm, car dealership owner
 Peter Carlberg as Peter, Minna's father
  as Sara, Minna's mother
  as Anna-Marie Pettersson, Rosengården (women's refuge) manager, houses Minna and Aron
 Malin Persson as Ebba Sjöstrand, runs Sisters Sjöstrand restaurant, caterer, mostly waitress, Agnes' sister
 Tove Edfeldt as Agnes Sjöstrand, runs Sisters Sjöstrand restaurant, caterer, mostly accounts, Ebba's sister
 Jessica Liedberg as Ulrika Gunnarsson, André's high-price lawyer
  as Emil Jonsson, boatyard owner, Andre's friend
  as Herman Virtanen, Minna's victim's counsel
  as Jocke, Sisters Sjöstrand's chef
 Kajsa Ernst as Marika Sjöstrand, executive director of alcohol importers, mother of Agnes and Ebba, Stefan's wife
  as Filip Westlund, Sjöstrand business manager, Marika's lover
  as Stefan Lundlin-Sjöstrand, Marika's second husband, Sjöstrand marketing manager
  as Kim Ohlsson, Norway-based Wine Sweden CEO, ex-convict

Season 7 additional cast 

 Ing-Marie Carlsson as Berit, Alexander's mother, owns boat
 Jacob Ericksson as Dennis, prominent businessman, Bengt-Olof's golf buddy
 Noa Hultén as Johan, Dennis' elder son, Anna's love interest, she dumps him, ecstasy dealer 
 Malte Gårdinger as Vincent Marklund, Johan's friend, ecstasy dealer
 Omeya Lundqvist-Simbizi as Ines Jacobsson, Anna's friend, works at cafe
  as "Knarkbaron" ('drug baron'), supplies ecstasy to Johan
  as "Festarrangör" ('party organiser'), runs Landline adult nightclub
  as Wilhelm "Wille" Bauer, Bauer Homes CEO, property speculator
  as Gisela, Nora's recently returned friend, married to Charles, has affair with Henrik
 Cecilia Nilsson as Eva, mother of Sebastian and Jonna, owner of Strömma Cement
  as Sebastian Carlmark, Eva's son, Strömma executive director, high-stakes gambler, heavy loser, Jonna's twin brother
  as Jonna Carlmark, Eva's daughter, Strömma treasurer and assistant director, Sebastian's twin sister
 Emil Almén as Louie, Julia's confidante and pimp
  as Kristina, former Sandhamn resident, rents Brandska, dating Anders
 Leonard Terfelt as Anders Lindén, Kristina's love interest
  as Sara Kallner, Anders girl-friend, found dead
  as Petra Kallner-Carlsén, Sara's sister
 Rakel Wärmländer as Maria, former anaesthetic nurse, Anders' wife, mother of two children, Robert's lover 
  as Robert, Maria's lover, Anders' former employee
 André Sjöberg as "Solmannen" ('Sunny Man') pseudonym of man on dating app, met Sara at Nag's Head bar
 Agnes Fred as "Bartender" (Milla), at Nag's Head
 Nora Rios as Jackie, handball camp supervisor
 Anita Bringås Wärmländer  as Unga Vicky ('Young Vicky'), Carl-Johan's ten year-old daughter, looks after five year-old brother, Kalle 
 Leif Andrée as Carl-Johan Berger, prominent child psychologist and author, married three times
 Cecilia Frode as Lisa Berger, Carl-Johan's third wife, organised his 50th jubilee party
  as Mona, rents Brandska, mother of Micke, diagnosed with MS
 Valter Skarsgård as Mikael "Micke" Lindgren, rents Brandska, son of Mona
 Hanna Dorsin as Eva, Carl-Johan's adult daughter from his first wife
 Måns Nathanaelson as Mats, Carl-Johan's adult son from his first wife
  as Karin, Mats' wife
  as "Vickys Mamma" ('Vicky's mom'), Carl-Johan's second wife, mother of Vicky and Kalle, divorces Carl-Johan after Kalle drowns, raises Vicky
 Jakob Setterberg as Martin Koronen, concierge for Carl-Johan's jubilee, has affair with Lisa
  as Carolina, 25 year-old waitress, works with Anna
 Björn A. Ling as Hans, Eva's husband

Season 8 additional cast 

  as Leo Strandberg, rich businessman, Angelica's husband, Bengt-Olof's neighbour
  as Eva Andrén, chief prosecutor, Nora's boss
  as Angelica Strandberg, Leo's wife, Bengt-Olof's lover
 Johan Widerberg as Sylvester Markell, professional thief, targets high-class victims. 
  as Kerstin Stenmark, Bengt-Olof's wife, Strandbergs' neighbour
 Ania Chorabik as Ursula Carlsson, Sylvester's lawyer
  as Karin Hagel, Sylvester's sometime lover, guards his locker
 Björn Bengtsson as Theo Skoog, renowned golfer, Lili's husband, Albert's father
 Cecilia von der Esch as Inga-Lili "Lili" Skoog ( Anderson), Theo's missing wife, Albert's mother
 Julius Fleischanderl as "Valpen" (English: "Puppy"), police rookie, Miriam's replacement
 Maja Johanna Englander as Evelina, Albert's nanny, becomes Theo's love interest
 Mia Benson as Anki Anderson, Lili's mother
 Jennifer Amaka Pettersson as Therese, Theo's friend, owns Sandhamn summerhouse
 Mattias Fransson as Jörgen Humle, chief counsellor, manages young offenders home
 Vilda Schubert as Nathalie, youth, Olivia's love interest, runs away from young offenders home
 Anton Forsdik as Sebastian Broberg, youth, Olivia's friend, runs away from camp
 Meliz Karlge as Johanna Fagenberg, lawyer, trust fund manager
 Adja Krook as Olivia Thoren, youth, Pär's distant relative, trust fund activated on her 18th birthday, missing from camp

Episode guide

Season 1

Season 2

Season 3

Season 4

Season 5

Season 6

Season 7

Season 8

Reception 

DVD Kritiks Maria Eremo, reflected on the first season, "even if there are some mistakes in policing... it makes it all a bit comical." In particular, Pekkari is "incredibly good" as Carina, and "makes the best impression." A "good effort" by Malmsjö as Henrik, who portrays "the jealous husband," as "not a very nice guy." The story is supported by, "very dramatic music," which "adds to the tension."

Thomas of Punk Rock Theary reviewed a box set of the first three seasons of The Sandhamn Murders. He observed, "as the series goes on, [Nora's] role becomes more important", while "the stories are only very loosely connected because the main characters are the same." Overall, "some of the plot twists are pretty far-fetched while some other developments are predictable doesn't exactly help speed things along." TV Show Pilots Justine Naboya included the series, as one of The 20 Best Scandinavian Crime Dramas, and noticed, "more often than not, the cases are revealed to be much more complex than they had initially (been) presumed."

Expressens Mattias Bergqvist felt Season 7 provides, "a breath of fresh and liberating" air. Its episodes are, "the first to leave [Sten's] novels", which provides "a freedom that is absolutely necessary to keep interest."

References

External links 

 
 
 Morden i Sandhamn Cast Lists at The Actors Compendium

2010 Swedish television series debuts
2010s crime drama television series
Swedish television shows
Swedish-language television shows
Television shows set in Stockholm
TV4 (Sweden) original programming